The 1840 Constitution of the Hawaiian Kingdom titled   was the first fully written constitution for the Hawaiian Kingdom. The need for a constitution was originally intended as a manner of laws set forth to control the Native Hawaiian population with a Western style and legal framework, giving less severe punishments, such as being exiled, than was the traditional custom until the 1840s. Christianity had failed to change many behaviors of the Hawaiian population, even with the support of the  families. Adultery and many other sexual relations became forbidden. Hawaiians were arrested and sentenced to severe punishments that were not well organised. The exiled had little food and could easily swim away from the islands and the prison at Honolulu Fort.

Overview
The constitution was enacted on October 8, 1840, by King Kamehameha III and Kekāuluohi as Kuhina Nui, an office similar to Prime Minister or co-regent. The constitution, compared to its predecessor, was extremely detailed. The June 7, 1839, document, sometimes called a constitution but more similar to a declaration of rights, stated simply that the government was based on Christian values and equality for all. Incorporating the 1839 document, the 1840 Constitution of the Kingdom of Hawai’i was a turning point in Hawai’i government.

This constitution organized the power of government and its functions by defining the House of Representatives as the legislative body, giving their people the power to vote, proclaiming the House of Kamehameha, establishing of the office of Kuhina Nui, creating of the office of royal governors of the various islands and recognizing Christianity as an authority.

Amendments
It could be changed by section 13, which gave the House of Nobles and the House of Representative the ability to change the constitution.

References

.
.

External links

 1839 and 1840 Constitutions (scanned images)
1839 Constitution (Full text, with access to an English translation, and other resources)
1840 Constitution (Full text, with access to an English translation, and other resources)

Constitution of the Hawaiian Kingdom
Hawaii law
Constitution of Hawaii
Hawaiian Kingdom
1840 in Hawaii
Legal history of Hawaii
1840 documents